Melissa Ivy Rauch (born June 23, 1980) is an American actress. She is known for playing Bernadette Rostenkowski-Wolowitz on the CBS sitcom The Big Bang Theory, for which she was nominated for the Critics' Choice Television Award for Best Supporting Actress in a Comedy Series in 2013. From 2004 to 2008, Rauch worked as a regular contributor on the VH1 series Best Week Ever. Rauch's other acting credits include playing Tina on the American remake of Kath & Kim, Summer on the HBO fantasy horror drama True Blood and currently plays the lead role on NBC's revival of Night Court.

Rauch also starred in, co-wrote and co-produced the 2015 sports comedy-drama film The Bronze and provided the voice of DC character Harley Quinn in the 2017 animated film Batman and Harley Quinn. Rauch also had supporting roles in I Love You, Man (2009), Ice Age: Collision Course and Flock of Dudes (both 2016), and Ode to Joy and The Laundromat (both 2019).

Early life
Rauch was born to Susan and David Rauch, a Jewish family living in Marlboro Township, New Jersey. She has a younger brother, Ben. She developed an interest in acting while attending Marlboro High School. Her Bat Mitzvah had a “Melissa’s Comedy Club” theme. Rauch graduated from Marymount Manhattan College in New York City in 2002.

Career
Some of Rauch's early work was as a regular contributor to VH1's Best Week Ever television show.

In 2009, Rauch began playing the recurring role of Bernadette Rostenkowski-Wolowitz, a co-worker of Penny's at The Cheesecake Factory who began to date Howard Wolowitz, in the third season of TV's The Big Bang Theory. The following season her character became Howard's fiancée and Rauch was promoted to a series regular. The characters married in the season five finale. In December 2011, Rauch and fellow cast members of The Big Bang Theory received the first of four nominations for the Screen Actors Guild Award for Outstanding Performance by an Ensemble in a Comedy Series.

Other acting credits include True Blood (on which she had a recurring role in 2010 as Summer, a girl who likes Hoyt), The Office, the American remake of the Australian TV series Kath & Kim, Wright v Wrong, and the film I Love You, Man.

Rauch is also part of the cast of the comedic stage show The Realest Real Housewives with Casey Wilson, June Diane Raphael, Jessica St. Clair and Danielle Schneider. The show began running at the Upright Citizens Brigade Theatre in 2011.

Rauch co-wrote and co-produced the film The Bronze, in which she starred as Hope Ann Greggory, a bronze medal-winning gymnast clinging to her glory days of 12 years earlier. It opened the 2015 Sundance Film Festival. Variety said, "Rauch, who co-wrote the screenplay with her husband Winston, has never carried a film before. But she delivers the best breakthrough comedic performance by an actress since Melissa McCarthy in Bridesmaids." Sony Pictures Classics acquired the film in September 2015.

In 2017, Rauch voiced Harley Quinn in the animated film Batman and Harley Quinn and she voiced Light Thief in "Light Riders" from Blaze and the Monster Machines.

She currently stars in the Night Court revival series  playing Judge Abby Stone, the daughter of Judge Harold T. Stone and Gina Stone from the original Night Court series. Season 1 premiered on NBC on January 17, 2023, and is co-produced by Rauch and her husband Winston Beigel, in association with Warner Bros. Television and Universal Television.

Personal life
Rauch is married to writer Winston Beigel, who collaborated with her on The Miss Education of Jenna Bush and other projects. Rauch announced that she was pregnant on July 11, 2017, and disclosed that she’d had a miscarriage previously. On December 4, 2017, Rauch announced on Instagram that she had given birth to a baby girl. On May 4, 2020, Rauch announced the birth of their son.

Rauch modeled the voice of Bernadette after her parents: the "sweet, high-pitched purr" is modeled after her mother, while the "eerie, haranguing imitation" of Mrs. Wolowitz is modeled after her father. Both are "very different" from Rauch's real voice.

Filmography

References

External links

 
 
 
 

1980 births
Actresses from New Jersey
Female models from New Jersey
American television actresses
American female models
Living people
Marlboro High School alumni
Marymount Manhattan College alumni
People from Marlboro Township, New Jersey
21st-century American actresses
American film actresses
American voice actresses
Jewish American actresses
21st-century American Jews